John Loder may refer to:

John Loder (actor) (1898–1988), British actor
John Loder (landowner) (c.1726–1805), English clergyman, landowner and founder of the Old Berkshire Hunt
John Loder (sound engineer) (1946–2005), English sound engineer, record producer and founder of Southern Studios
John Loder, 2nd Baron Wakehurst (1895–1970), British politician
John David Loder (1788–1846), English violinist